The Kojata is a right tributary of the Kara-Suu in Jalal-Abad Region, Kyrgyzstan. Its source is in the Chatkal Range, western Tian Shan mountains, and is fed by the Toskool, which flows out of Lake Sary-Chelek. It is 18 km long and has a drainage basin of 280 km2. It discharges into the Kara-Suu near Kyzyl-Tuu.

References

Rivers of Kyrgyzstan